In anatomy and neurology, the ventral root of spinal nerve, anterior root, or motor root  is the efferent motor root of a spinal nerve.

At its distal end, the ventral root joins with the dorsal root to form a mixed spinal nerve.

Additional images

References

External links
 
  - "Autonomic Connections of the Spinal Cord"
  - "Spinal Root Nerve Fibers"
 Diagram at tcc.fl.edu (look for #2)

Back anatomy
Peripheral nervous system